Israeli Transverse Mercator (ITM), also known as the New Israel Grid (NIG;  Reshet Yisra'el Ha-Ḥadasha) is the new geographic coordinate system for Israel.  The name is derived from the transverse Mercator projection it uses and the fact that it is optimized for Israel. ITM has replaced the old coordinate system Israeli Cassini Soldner (ICS), also known as the Old Israel Grid (OIG). It became 
the official grid for Israel in 1998.

The need for a new grid
ITM replaced the Old Israel Grid (OIG), also known as the Israel Cassini Soldner (ICS), which was based on the Cassini-Soldner projection. ICS in turn was a simple modification of the Palestine grid used during the British mandate. The central meridian in the new projection, as in the old one, crosses through Jerusalem. The new grid has two main advantages. One is that the Transverse Mercator projection is better for navigation than Cassini-Soldner. The other is that ICS was based on a 19th-century reference ellipsoid (approximation of the shape of the Earth) and this was replaced by a more accurate approximation.

Additional information on the creation of the new grid is available in Hebrew.

Examples

An ITM coordinate is generally given as a pair of six digit numbers (excluding any digits behind a decimal point which may be used in very precise surveying). The first number is always the Easting and the second is the Northing. The easting and northing are in metres from the false origin.

The ITM coordinate for the Western Wall at Jerusalem is 222286 632556, which means

E 222286 m
N 631556 m

The first figure is the easting and means that the location is 222,286 meters east from the false origin (along the X axis). The second figure is the northing and puts the location 631,556 meters north of the false origin (along the Y axis). Also notice how the easting in this example is indicated with an “E” and likewise an “N” for the northing.

The table below shows the same coordinate in 3 different grids:

Grid Parameters
The ITM coordinate system is defined by the following parameters:

Projection

Transverse Mercator

Reference ellipsoid

Origin Point

False Origin

Parameters for conversion to WGS84 

Reference ellipsoid

Shift

Rotation

Scale

See also
 ICS
 GRS80
 Transverse Mercator

References

External links
 MAPI (Mapping Center of Israel) official website (Hebrew).
 Converting latitude and longitude to ITM coordinates (free and open source software).
 Geography educational website of Haifa's university.

Geographic coordinate systems
Geography of Israel
Land surveying systems
Geodesy